Brierley Hill Alliance F.C. was an English association football club based in Brierley Hill in the West Midlands.

Formed in 1887 from a merger of Brockmoor Harriers and Brockmoor Pickwicks, the club joined the Birmingham & District League in 1890 and the team were league champions on two occasions and runners-up on four occasions.  The club was also notable for being involved in the first ever FA Cup match to be played under floodlights, when they took on Kidderminster Harriers in September 1955, losing the preliminary round replay 4–2.

Alliance also won the Birmingham Senior Cup in 1932–33, 1936–37, 1951–52 and 1952–53.

The club began at Brockmoor Harriers' Labour In Vain ground in Moor Street, then moved to Cottage Street during the 1888–89 season. This was their home until 1977: it is now a supermarket car park. Alliance moved to The Dell which was their home until the club folded in June 1981.

Former players
1. Players that have played/managed in the Football League or any foreign equivalent to this level (i.e. fully professional league).
2. Players with full international caps.
3. Players that hold a club record.
 Cecil Blakemore – played in the Football League
 Harry Hancock – played in the Football League
 Andrew Smith  – played in the Football League and the Scottish League
 Harry Stanford – played in the Football League

References

Defunct football clubs in England
Sport in Dudley
Brierley Hill
Association football clubs established in 1887
Association football clubs disestablished in 1981
1887 establishments in England
1981 disestablishments in England
Defunct football clubs in the West Midlands (county)